The 2018 season was the New York Giants' 94th in the National Football League (NFL), their ninth playing their home games at MetLife Stadium and their first under head coach Pat Shurmur. The Giants entered the season looking to improve on their 2017 campaign, which saw the team finish with a 3–13 record, their worst since the adoption of a 16-game regular season. Despite starting 1–7 for the second consecutive year, the Giants managed to improve on their 3–13 campaign with a 30–27 win over the Chicago Bears. After a 17–0 shutout loss to the Titans in Week 15, the Giants missed the playoffs for the second straight season. The season was highlighted by blown fourth-quarter leads much like 2015, the Giants were in 12 one-possession games and lost eight games by seven points or fewer. The Giants finished the season 5–11 and last place in the NFC East for the second straight year and the first time they finished last in back to back years since 1977 and 1978.

Despite the 5–11 record, the season was highlighted with rookie running back Saquon Barkley who won many awards including Pepsi Rookie of the Year, FedEx Ground NFL Player of the Year, AP NFL Offensive Rookie of the Year and was named to the PFWA All-Rookie Team and AP All-Rookie teams.

Player movements

Free agency

Players with the Giants in the 2017 season

Players signed by the Giants from other teams

Draft

Notes
The Giants were awarded a fourth-round compensatory pick (135th overall).

Draft trades
The Giants traded a compensatory fourth-round selection (135th overall) and a sixth-round selection (176th overall) to the Los Angeles Rams in exchange for a seventh-round selection in 2019 and linebacker Alec Ogletree.
The Giants traded a fourth-round selection (102nd overall) and defensive end Jason Pierre-Paul to the Tampa Bay Buccaneers in exchange for a third-round selection (69th overall) and a fourth-round selection (108th overall).
The Giants traded a seventh-round selection (220th overall) to the Pittsburgh Steelers in exchange for defensive back Ross Cockrell.

Supplemental Draft

 The Giants selected Western Michigan cornerback Sam Beal in the 2018 Supplemental draft. As a result, the team forfeited their 3rd-round selection in the 2019 draft.

Undrafted free agents 
The Giants signed a number of undrafted free agents. Unless stated otherwise, they were signed on May 11, 2018.

Other signings

Practice squad 
Having been cut as the roster was trimmed to the 53-man limit on September 1, Jawill Davis, Garrett Dickerson, Grant Haley, Jhurell Pressley, Alonzo Russell, Victor Salako, Avery Moss and Calvin Munson cleared waivers and were resigned to the practice squad. They were joined over the following days by linebacker Ukeme Eligwe and defensive tackle Josh Banks, who had been waived by the Giants on September 2. On September 13, Munson was released and replaced by offensive tackle Brian Mihalik.

Other departures

Trade details
 On March 7, 2018, the Giants acquired linebacker Alec Ogletree from the Los Angeles Rams in exchange for a 4th (#135, John Franklin-Myers) and a 6th (#176. John Kelly) round pick in the 2018 NFL Draft. In the deal, the Giants also acquired a 7th round pick in the 2019 NFL Draft.

 On March 22, 2018, the Giants traded defensive end Jason Pierre-Paul to the Tampa Bay Buccaneers in exchange for their 3rd round pick and swapping 4th round picks in the 2018 NFL Draft.

 On April 20, 2018, the Giants acquired punter Riley Dixon from the Denver Broncos in exchange for a conditional 7th round draft pick in the 2019 NFL Draft.

 On August 26, 2018, the Giants traded center Brett Jones to the Minnesota Vikings in exchange for a 7th round pick in the 2019 NFL Draft.

 On October 23, 2018, the Giants traded cornerback Eli Apple to the New Orleans Saints in exchange for a 4th round pick in the 2019 NFL Draft and a 7th round pick in the 2020 draft.

Staff

Final roster

Schedule

Preseason

Regular season

Note: Intra-division opponents are in bold text.

Game summaries

Week 1: vs. Jacksonville Jaguars

With the loss, the Giants started 0–1 for the second consecutive season. First round pick Saquon Barkley scored his first career NFL touchdown.

Week 2: at Dallas Cowboys

With the loss, the Giants started 0–2 for the second consecutive season. It was 20–3 for most of the 4th quarter until the Giants scored 10 points in the final 2:09.

Week 3: at Houston Texans
Odell Beckham surpassed Lionel Taylor (319) for the most receptions by a player through his first 50 career games with 337 catches (he would be passed by Michael Thomas (346) in 2019).

With the win, the Giants improved to 1–2.

Week 4: vs. New Orleans Saints

With the loss, the Giants fell to 1–3.

Week 5: at Carolina Panthers

Odell Beckham threw a touchdown pass to Saquon Barkley and also caught his first touchdown pass since breaking his ankle the year before. Similar to the Eagles game in Week 3 last season, the Giants rallied back in the 4th quarter, but were overshadowed by a 63-yard game-winning field goal by Graham Gano. However, controversy surrounded after the game, where players believed there was a wrong call on the final drive on a 3rd and 1 run by Christian McCaffrey and another wrong pass interference call on Landon Collins. This game marked the first time the Giants scored 30 or more points in a game since Week 17 of the 2015 season.

Week 6: vs. Philadelphia Eagles

Saquon Barkley starred in his first primetime game as a pro, but the rest of the Giants were overmatched by the Eagles on a rainy Thursday night.

Week 7: at Atlanta Falcons

The Giants failed to capitalize on offense, including missing a critical 4th and Goal at the 1 yard line. They were unable to complete a comeback, and fell to 1–6 with the loss.

Week 8: vs. Washington Redskins

With the loss, the Giants entered their bye week at 1–7. This is the last time Washington beat the Giants as the Redskins, as they changed their name before the 2020 NFL season.

Week 10: at San Francisco 49ers

Despite fires threatening the region, the Giants and 49ers played a Monday Night thriller. The Giants managed to complete a comeback over the 49ers with Sterling Shepard's game-winning touchdown with 53 seconds remaining. The Giants snapped a 5-game losing streak and improved to 2–7. They beat an NFC team other than the Washington Redskins for the first time since Week 15 of the 2016 season. Odell Beckham Jr. also had 2 touchdowns in the win. This was the last primetime win of Eli Manning's career.

Week 11: vs. Tampa Bay Buccaneers

The Giants improved to 3–7 with 152 total yards and 3 touchdowns from Saquon Barkley. Eli Manning completed 17 of 18 passes with a 155.8 passer rating.

Week 12: at Philadelphia Eagles

The Giants came out hot in a must win game, but squandered a 19–3-second quarter lead when Manning forced a pick deep in Eagles territory, who responded with a touchdown and 2-point conversion. The Eagles offense controlled the time of possession in the second half, and Jake Elliott kicked a game-winning field goal with 22 seconds remaining, his second against the Giants in as many seasons. With the loss, the Eagles tied the all-time series at 86–86–2, and is tied for the first time since it was 0–0 in 1933.

Week 13: vs. Chicago Bears

The Giants won in overtime and was Eli Manning's 37th and final game-winning drive in his career, which at the time put him in 9th place all-time. In his final game with the Giants, Odell Beckham Jr. threw and caught a touchdown pass, as he was inactive for the last 4 games of the season with a quad injury and then traded to the Cleveland Browns in the offseason. Kicker Aldrick Rosas converted the longest field goal in Giants franchise history to end the first half.

With the win, the Giants improved to 4–8 and surpassed their win total from 2017.

Week 14: at Washington Redskins

With this win, the Giants became the first team in NFL history to defeat a single opponent 100 times. This was the first time the Giants scored 40 or more points since Week 8 of the 2015 season and they improved to 5–8. Saquon Barkley also set a career high for rushing yards in a game.

Week 15: vs. Tennessee Titans

Both teams struggled to move the ball on a cold, rainy, and windy day. The Titans were able to silence Saquon Barkley while Derrick Henry finally broke through the Giants defense after wearing them down. The Giants were shut out for the first time since 2017 and eliminated from playoff contention, falling to 5-9. This was their first shutout at home since week 15 of the 2013 season.

Week 16: at Indianapolis Colts

Andrew Luck orchestrated the final game-winning drive of his career and the Giants fell to 5–10. The Colts were one of three teams Eli Manning never defeated in his career (the other two being the Giants and the Los Angeles Chargers).

Week 17: vs. Dallas Cowboys

In a meaningless game for both teams, Dak Prescott and Eli Manning traded shots in the air, but it was Prescott and the Cowboys who had the last word. Prescott connected with Cole Beasley on a 4th Down and also connected with Michael Gallup on the ensuing two-point conversion. The Giants season ended at 5–11 and they lost their 4th consecutive game to the Cowboys. Saquon Barkley went on to win Rookie of the Year.

Standings

Division

Conference

References

New York Giants
New York Giants seasons
New York Giants season
21st century in East Rutherford, New Jersey
Meadowlands Sports Complex